The , or , is a Japanese mountain range which stretches through Nagano, Toyama and Gifu prefectures. A small portion of the mountains also reach into Niigata Prefecture. William Gowland coined the phrase "Japanese Alps" during his time in Japan, but he was only referring to the Hida Mountains when he used that name. The Kiso and Akaishi mountains received the name in the ensuing years.

Geography 
The layout of the Hida Mountains forms a large Y-shape. The southern peaks are the lower portion of the Y-shape, with the northern peaks forming two parallel bands separated by a deep V-shaped valley. It is one of the steepest V-shaped valleys in Japan. The Kurobe Dam, Japan's largest dam, is an arch dam located in the Kurobe Valley in the central area of the mountains. The western arm of mountains, also known as the Tateyama Peaks (立山連峰 Tateyama Renpō), are dominated by Mount Tsurugi and Mount Tate. The eastern arm, known as the Ushiro Tateyama Peaks (後立山連峰 Ushiro Tateyama Renpō), are dominated by Mount Shirouma and Mount Kashimayari.

Glaciers
Although it was originally thought that no glaciers existed in East Asia south of Kamchatka, recent research has shown that three small glaciers still survive in Mount Tsurugi and Mount Tate owing to the extremely wet climate of the Hokuriku region allowing for very heavy snowfalls on the high peaks.

Major peaks 
 Mount Shirouma, 
 Mount Kashimayari, 
 Mount Tate, 
 Mount Tsubakuro, 
 Mount Tsurugi, 
 Mount Noguchigoro, 
 Mount Yari, 
 Mount Hotaka, 
 Mount Norikura,

Gallery

See also 
 Japanese Alps
 Kiso Mountains (Central Alps)
 Akaishi Mountains (Southern Alps)
 List of mountains in Japan
 100 Famous Japanese Mountains
 Chūbu-Sangaku National Park

References

External links 

 North Alps Broad Band Network  
 Northern Alps Lodging Cooperative 
 Northern Alps Information for Gifu Prefecture 

 
Japan Alps
Mountain ranges of Gifu Prefecture
Mountain ranges of Nagano Prefecture
Mountain ranges of Niigata Prefecture
Mountain ranges of Toyama Prefecture